Era is an unincorporated community in Cooke County, Texas, United States.  It's a small farming town in the southwest portion of the county. Era was founded in 1878, after Judge J.M. Lindsay donated 6 acres for a school. The town was named for Era Hargrove, the daughter of an early settler. Today, the community of Era has a school, post office, volunteer fire department, 2 mechanic shops, a welding shop, a hair cutting salon, a feed store and a convenience store with a Subway.

About 7 miles west of Era, there is the Liberman Broadcasting Tower Era, one of earth's tallest structures, and as of May 2007 was the tallest structure in Texas. The tower is named for its proximity to Era, though it is much closer to Rosston and Leo.

The Era Independent School District serves area students.

Climate
The climate in this area is characterized by hot, humid summers and generally mild to cool winters.  According to the Köppen Climate Classification system, Era has a humid subtropical climate, abbreviated "Cfa" on climate maps.

References

Unincorporated communities in Texas
Unincorporated communities in Cooke County, Texas